Bajhang Airport  is a domestic airport located in Jayaprithvi  serving Bajhang District, a district in Sudurpashchim Province in Nepal.

History
The airport was originally opened in October 1976 but ceased to operate after road access to the district headquarter Chainpur was established in 2008. There are plans to reopen the airport after the runway is blacktopped, which was due to be done by 2020.
Until 2022, there were no scheduled services to and from Bajhang Airport. Previously Nepal Airlines operated routes to Nepalgunj and Dhangadhi.

Facilities

Airlines and destinations

See also
List of airports in Nepal

References

External links
 

Airports in Nepal
Buildings and structures in Sudurpashchim Province
Buildings and structures in Bajhang District